Young-hee, also spelled Young-hi, Yong-hui or Yong-hi, is a Korean unisex given name. The meaning differs based on the hanja used to write each syllable of the given name. There are 34 hanja with the reading "young" and 25 hanja with the reading "hee" on the South Korean government's official list of hanja which may be used in given names. Young-hee was the third-most popular name for newborn girls in South Korea in 1950, falling to ninth place by 1960.

People with this name include:

Academics and artists
Kim Yong-hee (singer) (born 2000), South Korean singer (CIX band member)
Lee Young-hee (designer) (1936–2018), South Korean hanbok designer
Younghi Pagh-Paan (born 1945), South Korean-born German composer
Chang Young-hee (1952–2009), South Korean writer
Lee Young-hee (physicist) (born 1955), South Korean physicist
Yang Yong-hi (born 1964), Zainichi Korean writer
Young-Hee Chan, South Korean-born Australian classical double-bassist

Entertainers
Ko Yong-hui (1951–2004), North Korean dancer, mistress of Kim Jong-il and mother of Kim Jong-un
Na Young-hee (born 1961), South Korean actress
Seo Young-hee (born 1980), South Korean actress
Kim Young-hee (comedian) (born 1983), South Korean comedian

Sportspeople
Kim Yeong-hui (speed skater) (born 1955), South Korean speed skater
Kim Yeong-hui (rower) (born 1962), South Korean rower
Kim Young-hee (basketball) (born 1963), South Korean basketball player
Pak Yong-hui (born 1970), North Korean sport shooter
Han Yeong-hui (born 1973), South Korean swimmer
Moon Young-hui (born 1983), South Korean field hockey player
Son Young-hee (born 1993), South Korean weightlifter

Fictional characters 

 Young-hee, the animatronic doll featured in Squid Game.

See also
List of Korean given names
Kim Yong-hee (disambiguation), for people with Yong (용) rather than Yeong (영) in the first syllable of their given name

References

Korean unisex given names